Kaeng Sopha is a subdistrict in the Wang Thong District of Phitsanulok Province, Thailand.

Geography
Kaeng Sopha lies in the Nan Basin, which is part of the Chao Phraya Watershed.  The Wang Thong River flows through the subdistrict.

Administration
The following is a list of the subdistrict's mubans, which roughly correspond to the villages:

References

Tambon of Phitsanulok province
Populated places in Phitsanulok province